Jimdo is a German website-builder. The company is privately held and headquartered in Hamburg, Germany, with offices in Munich and Tokyo. Jimdo has two products, Creator and Dolphin, offering free and paid plans.

Jimdo Dolphin is an AI-powered website-builder designed for users with basic computer skills and automates most of the website building process. It uses artificial intelligence to get to know the user, their business, and their goals, then builds a website that is already fully personalized to meet their needs.

Jimdo Creator is a drag-and-drop website builder and hosting service suitable for users with some coding skills.

History
Jimdo was founded in 2007 by Matthias Henze, Christian Springub, and Fridtjof Detzner.

While they were still in high school, Springub and Detzner started their first internet agency, designing websites for small businesses in Cuxhaven, Germany. When Matthias Henze joined the company in 2004, the team decided to build their own content management system, which would go on to become Jimdo in 2007.

In April 2009, after Yahoo! announced that GeoCities was closing, Jimdo announced that former GeoCities users were welcome on Jimdo. Jimdo started the "Lifeboat for GeoCities" promotion to help users transition to Jimdo. Jimdo offered a ten percent discount to users who moved from GeoCities and Google Page Creator to Jimdo.

In 2010, Jimdo added a "store" service that allows Jimdo website owners to conduct electronic commerce services. Also in 2010, United Internet withdrew from the company's board. In February 2012, the 5 millionth Jimdo site went online and in November 2013, the 10 millionth. As of July 2019, over 25 million websites have been created with Jimdo.

On June 8th 2015, Jimdo secured 25 million euros worth of investment from the American company, Spectrum Equity. With this investment, Spectrum Equity now holds a share of 26.7 percent of Jimdo GmbH although the company remains privately held. In October 2016, Jimdo laid off 25% of its staff in a bid to regain focus after founders recognized that the company was getting slower at product development. Co-founder, Henze, described the decision as Jimdo's "most difficult moment".

In 2017, Jimdo launched its new artificially-intelligent website builder, Jimdo Dolphin. The new AI-powered product enables users with basic computer skills to build their own websites.

Corporate affairs

The Jimdo head office is in Hamburg, Germany. It also has offices in Munich and Tokyo. As of 2019, Jimdo has an international team of 220 employees worldwide.

Service
Jimdo offers two different services; Creator is the company's original drag-and-drop website builder, and Dolphin is the company's new AI website builder. Both products offer free and premium subscription plans. As of 2019, there are seven languages available: English, German, French, Italian, Japanese, Dutch, and Spanish. The English-language service uses American English. To increase speed and performance for their worldwide user base, Jimdo maintains data centers in Germany and Japan.

Jimdo Creator 
Jimdo Creator was launched in February 2007. It is a website builder that is suitable for users with some technical expertise, who want to build their website from scratch and customize it using code. Creator offers a free plan and four premium subscription plans; Pro, Business, SEO Plus, and Platinum.

Jimdo Dolphin 
Jimdo Dolphin was launched in March 2018, with a preview release in October 2017. It is an AI-driven website builder that is designed to make website building accessible to users with no experience. Dolphin gets to know the user, their business, and their goals, then build a website that is already personalized to fit their requirements. Dolphin offers the user fewer options than Creator, to make the process of building a website as fast and as simple as possible.

On its release, Jimdo's CEO and co-founder, Matthias Henze, said the company had seen "an opportunity to make website creation radically easier", describing Dolphin as "a new kind of website builder that asks you brief questions about your business, and then creates a totally personalized website with text, photos, and other details already filled in".

Dolphin users are guided through the website creation process by a wizard, which prompts them to answer questions about the purpose and goals of their website. Users have the option to connect their social media accounts and automatically sync images from their social profiles to their websites. Dolphin then builds a personalized website complete with texts and images tailored to the user's industry and specific goals. Once their website is created, users can choose to use the integrated Assistant to guide them through each step of the website building process and learn to use features like Dolphin's automatic SEO.

Jimdo Dolphin Reviews 
In December 2018, Robert Brandl from WebToolTester.com reported "impressive" results with Jimdo Dolphin, "You can actually create the first draft [of your website] in just 3 minutes [...] If you’re prepared to invest another hour or two into customizing the text and adding further subpages, the final product can be made to look really impressive". But describes the "basic level of SEO optimization" as "disappointing as it stands".

In February 2019, Chris Singleton from Style Factory gave Jimdo 3/5 stars, "It’s well-suited to small businesses that require a simple online presence and/or shop, but don’t have the budget, expertise or time to grapple with more complex systems".

In October 2019, Hendrick Human from WebsitePlanet.com rated Jimdo 4.7/5 stars, "If you’re new to building websites and all you want is a simple website with a blog or online store and decent SEO, then it’s not a bad option. If you have bigger plans for your site, there’s a good chance you’ll find Jimdo [Dolphin] too restrictive".

Online Store 
In February 2019, Jimdo added an online "store" to its new website builder, Dolphin, to let users conduct electronic commerce. The drag-and-drop style is suitable for users without any technical knowledge who want to sell products online. Users can choose to receive payments via SEPA Direct Debit, credit card, or PayPal.

"The top two [Jimdo Dolphin subscription] plans make it easy to start an e-commerce store. You just start adding products. Both plans allow you to add as many as you like, but the eCommerce plan is limited in that you only have 50 pages to work with. You can take payments using SEPA Direct Debit, PayPal, or credit card. And unlike some e-commerce website builders, Jimdo does not take a cut of your sells". Frank Moraes from HTML.com.

Dolphin Subscription Plans 
Dolphin users can choose from five subscription plans when building their website or online store with, including a free plan and four premium plans.

Dolphin's free plan, Play, includes many basic features included in the paid plans. Play customers get a personalized subdomain (e.g., www.yourwebsite.jimdosite.com), HTTPS encryption, and up to 5 website pages. Play websites have advertisements on them.

Dolphin's premium plans include a free domain for the first year, email features, extra storage and bandwidth, more responsive customer support, access to the Jimdo Boost and Jimdo Live Chat apps, additional website pages, and no advertisements.

Unlimited plans also include access to the Business Listings app, which allows users to synchronize their business information on multiple online platforms, including Facebook, Google, and Bing, for increased online visibility.

Mobile Applications
Jimdo launched its first mobile application in February 2014. As of October 2019, Jimdo has four apps available for iOS and Android.

 Jimdo Boost app (Jimdo Dolphin, Android and iOS) 
 In June 2019, Jimdo launched a new version of its latest app, Jimdo Boost, to accompany its AI-driven website builder, Jimdo Dolphin. Users with an existing Dolphin website and premium plan can use the app to monitor analytics data, like the quantity of website visitors. The app combines these insights with daily tips, SEO tools, and marketing guidance in a "story" format to help users improve the performance of their website.
 Jimdo Creator app (Creator, Android, and iOS) 
 The Jimdo Creator app can be used to build Jimdo Creator websites and make edits to existing Creator websites.
 Jimdo Live Chat app (Jimdo Dolphin & Creator, Android & iOS)
 Jimdo's Live Chat app allows users to integrate a "live chat" feature to their Jimdo website. Users can chat directly with their website visitors via the smartphone app to answer questions or offer support.
 Jimdo Analytics app (Creator, iOS)
 The Jimdo Analytics app is available to users with a Google Analytics account that is connected to an existing Jimdo website. Users can track their website's analytics data, such as; the number of visitors, most popular pages, and website traffic sources. All from a dashboard on their mobile device. The Analytics app is 
 available for iOS 10.0 and higher.

Reception
Two months after the service launch in 2007, Rafe Needleman of CNet gave a positive review to Jimdo. Needleman described Jimdo as a "good service for creating a quick site to document a trip or other event, or to prototype a simple personal or business site." He also said that Jimdo was not "mature enough yet" for use by a United States-based small business, "but it's worth keeping track of." In 2010, VentureBeat reported on the opening of the US office in San Francisco and the launch of an online store feature, concluding "US readers will probably hear more about the company in the coming months".

In 2012, David Pogue cited Jimdo in The New York Times, as a recommended replacement for the website building feature in Apple's "MobileMe" service, following Apple's decision to shut down the service on 30 June 2012. Reasoning that "Jimdo’s design templates are better looking [than Weebly’s], and the paid plan offers more advanced features. You can even sell stuff from your Jimdo site".

In 2013, USA Today commended Jimdo for "how easily it handles e-commerce" and its "ease of use", recommending it for small business owners who would be "unlikely to find a simpler solution".

In June 2018, following the release of Jimdo's new AI-driven website builder, Dolphin, Forbes writer Alison Coleman hailed the service as an alternative to "traditional website builders" that have "become extremely powerful and able to create extremely sophisticated results, but for most people, they still take too long and involve a steep learning curve". In contrast, Jimdo Dolphin "pulls everything together quickly, and their online content is ready and waiting. From there [Dolphin] provides further support, for example, handling some of the SEO tasks".

Advertising
In October 2019, Jimdo secured its first celebrity endorsement and released a television commercial featuring the American actor, Neil Patrick Harris.

See also

 Website builder

References

External links
 Jimdo

Web hosting
Free web hosting services
Companies based in Hamburg
Online companies of Germany
Companies' terms of service